Diego Gómez Cabrera (1936 – 3 March 2021) was a Spanish journalist, actor, editor, television presenter and broadcaster.

Biography
Born in the Málaga district of Churriana in 1936, Gómez lived part of his childhood in the Huelin neighborhood. He studied drama at the Conservatory of Málaga.

He began his radio career through the airwaves of Radio Juventud-La Voz de Málaga, presenting for nearly forty years the program 'Cancionero', from where he broadcast and promoted songs. On Radio Juventud, he was a radio partner of María Teresa Campos. Together they presented, since 1972, the 'Estrellas de la Copla' program and for several years, various outdoor shows held at the Tivoli amusement park and other shows. Some time later, he took over the program ‘El patio de Radiolé’ on the Radiolé network and worked at Radio Nacional de España.

Gómez also appeared on the small screen, through Televisión Española, in the program 'Pasa la vida'; and in other channels such as: Localia Televisión and Canal Sur.

His incursion into the journalistic world took place through the newspaper Diario Sur where he wrote, for ten years, a weekly page entitled 'Musical Sunday'.

Closely linked to the world of Málaga confraternity, Gómez was the older brother of the Royal Brotherhood of Our Lady of Rocío de Málaga. For more than forty years, he broadcast the central acts of Holy Week in Málaga. Every year, he recited the poem by Luis María Cabanillas to the Captive Christ. He recorded several albums as a reciter of popular poems and lyrics with his unmistakable voice. Since 1988, he was a member of the San Juan de Ávila Family Apostolate Movement.

Personal life and death
Gómez was married to Lucía Redoli; they had two children and four grandchildren. He died at the age of 84 in the Regional Hospital of Málaga, where he had been admitted for several weeks because of the COVID-19 during the COVID-19 pandemic in Spain.

References

1936 births
2021 deaths
People from Málaga
Spanish music journalists
Spanish radio presenters
Spanish television journalists
Spanish television presenters
Deaths from the COVID-19 pandemic in Spain